Lalor is an Irish surname derived from the Irish Ó Leathlobhair, from leath- “leper; weak, ailing person”. Notable people with the surname include:

 Denis Lalor, athlete
 Francis Ramsey Lalor (1856–1929), politician
 John Lalor (1814–1856), journalist and author
 John Joseph Lalor (1840/1841–1899), political scientist
 James Fintan Lalor, Irish rebel
 Kieran Lalor, politician
 Mike Lalor (born 1963), ice hockey player
 Patrick Lalor (1926–2016), Irish politician
 Peter Lalor, the leader of the Eureka Stockade rebellion
 Richard Lalor (1823–1893), politician
 Richard Lalor Sheil (1791–1851), politician, writer and orator
 Teresa Lalor (?-1846), Irish nun
 Patrick "Patt" Lalor (1781-1856), Irish national politician
nun
 Foster Mitchell Lalor, Jr. (1923-1991), Rear Admiral, U.S. Navy

See also
 Lalor, Victoria, an outer suburb of Melbourne, Victoria, Australia
 Lalor railway station, a station on the South Morang railway line
 Lalor Park, New South Wales
 Division of Lalor, an electoral district in the Australian House of Representatives in Victoria, Australia
 ST Lalor, a tugboat
 Lawlor

English-language surnames
Surnames of Irish origin